Government Engineering College, Patan (GEC Patan) is an AICTE approved post-secondary engineering college located in Katpur village near Patan, Gujarat, India.
It was founded in April 2004, and was moved to Katpur in August 2008.

History
Government Engineering College, Patan was established in April 2004 with three branches Computer Engineering, Electronics and Communication Engineering and Mechanical Engineering each with intake of 60 totaling to 180. The institute was initially functioning in the premises of the K. D. Polytechnic, Patan temporarily. It was shifted to its own newly built up green premise in August 2008 at Katpur village on Chanasma-Patan road  before Patan. Two more branches of Electrical Engineering and Civil Engineering each with intake of 60 were introduced from June-2009 and the intake of all three existing branches were increased to 120. Currently, institute functions with total intake of 480 in five different branches.

Programs
GEC Patan's vision is to prepare Human Resource with value based competency for technical advancements and growth of society.

The institute runs 5 undergraduate programs.

Degree programs (full-time): 
 Civil Engineering
 Computer Science Engineering
 Electrical Engineering
 Electronics and Communication Engineering
 Mechanical Engineering

TEQIP
GEC Patan comes under the second phase of TEQIP(A world bank project).

Facilities
The institute provides hostels for men and women, laboratories, a workshop, canteen and a gymkhana building, National Service Scheme Unit(NSS UNIT) & Fit india Youth CLub (FIYC GEC PATAN).

References

External links

AICTE Approved Institutes

Patan district
Engineering colleges in Gujarat